Table tennis at the 2017 Summer Deaflympics in Samsun, Turkey took place at İlkadım Archery Sports Hall.'''

Medal summary

Medalists

Results

Women's team

Group A

Group B

Knockout

Classification

Men's team

Group A

Group B

Group C

Group D

Elimination round

5th–8th Classification round

9th–16th Classification round

13th–16th Classification round

References

External links
 Table tennis pdf

2017 Summer Deaflympics
2017 in table tennis